Women Are Trouble is a 1936 American crime film directed by Errol Taggart and written by Michael Fessier. The film stars Stuart Erwin, Paul Kelly, Florence Rice, Margaret Irving, Cy Kendall and John Harrington. The film was released on July 31, 1936, by Metro-Goldwyn-Mayer.

Plot

Cast 
Stuart Erwin as Matt Casey
Paul Kelly as Bill Blaine
Florence Rice as Ruth Nolan
Margaret Irving as Frances Blaine
Cy Kendall as Inspector Matson
John Harrington as Gleason
Harold Huber as Pete the Pusher
Kitty McHugh as Della Murty
Raymond Hatton as Joe Murty
George Chandler as Reporter

See also 
Casey, Crime Photographer

References

External links 
 

1936 films
American crime films
1936 crime films
Metro-Goldwyn-Mayer films
American black-and-white films
Films scored by Edward Ward (composer)
1930s English-language films
Films directed by Errol Taggart
1930s American films